Jocelyne Felx (born January 2, 1949) is a Quebec literary critic and writer.

Biography
The daughter of Jeanne d'Arc Marleau and Laurier Chartrand, she was born in Saint-Lazare de Vaudreuil and studied French literature at the Université de Montréal and the Université du Québec à Chicoutimi. In 1975, she published her first novel Les vierges folles. Felx has contributed essays and critical writing to various literary magazines and has been poetry critic for Lettres québécoises.

Awards and honours
In 1982, she received the Prix Émile-Nelligan for Orpailleuse. Felx was awarded the Prix de littérature Gérald-Godin for her collection Les Pavages du désert. In 1995, La Pierre et les heures was included on the shortlist for the Governor General's Award for French-language poetry.

Selected works
 Les vierges folles (1975)
 Les petits camions rouges (1975)
 Feuillets embryonnaires (1980)
 Orpailleuse (1982)
 Nickel-odeon (1985)
 Les Pavages du désert (1988)
 Chute libre (1991)
 La pierre et les heures (1995)
 Poèmes choisis. Émile nelligan/le récital de l'ange (1997)
 La question de Nicodème (2000)
L'échelle et l'olivier (2006)
 Le nord des heures (2012)
Source for works:

References 

1949 births
Living people
Canadian poets in French
Journalists from Quebec
Canadian novelists in French
Université de Montréal alumni
Canadian women poets
Canadian women novelists
Canadian women journalists
People from Greater Montreal
Université du Québec à Chicoutimi alumni
20th-century Canadian novelists
20th-century Canadian poets
20th-century Canadian women writers
21st-century Canadian novelists
21st-century Canadian poets
21st-century Canadian women writers
Canadian literary critics
Women literary critics
Writers from Quebec
Canadian women non-fiction writers